Hervé Batoménila (born 18 May 1984 in Les Pavillons-sous-Bois) is a Gabonese professional football player, who currently, plays in the Premier Development League for FC Miami City.

Early life
Batoménila (aka Bato), was born in the Parisian suburb of Les Pavillons-sous-Bois to Gabonese parents.

International career
On 24 March 2009 was called up to the Gabon national football team, but has yet to debut for the squad.
After a strong carrier in France, Bato decided to try his chance overseas. He has been signed by the FC Miami City, American soccer team based in Miami, Florida, United States. The team plays in the Premier Development League.

References

1984 births
Living people
French footballers
Gabonese footballers
Ligue 2 players
Dijon FCO players
French sportspeople of Gabonese descent
Footballers from Seine-Saint-Denis
Association football defenders
Black French sportspeople